Harry Williams (born 1951) is a former soccer player. He was the first recognised  Indigenous Australian to play for the senior Australian national football team, the Socceroos. He was part of Australia's 1974 FIFA World Cup squad.

Early life
Williams was born in 1951 in Sydney. From the age of nine, Williams played junior soccer for St George Police Boys side in Sydney.

Career
Williams played in the New South Wales competition for St George.

He was recruited to the national side at the age of 19, and went on an overseas tour with the team in 1970. In 1974, having only played six matches for Australia as a senior, Williams was part of Australia's first foray into the World Cup Finals in West Germany.

Including qualifiers, Williams played six World Cup matches for Australia during his career. In total, he represented Australia 17 times between 1970 and 1978.

Recognition
A 2005 photo of Williams by photographer Sahlan Hayes was purchased by the National Gallery of Australia.

Family
He is the first cousin of basketball player Claude Williams, who was the first and only Aboriginal basketball coach. Claude is the son of musician Claude "Candy" Williams.

References

External links
 

1951 births
Living people
Soccer players from Sydney
Indigenous Australian soccer players
Australia international soccer players
1974 FIFA World Cup players
Association football defenders
Australian soccer players